Andrea Legarreta (born Andrea Legarreta Martínez; 12 July 1972) is a Mexican actress and television host, she is best known as being one of the main hosts of the TV morning show Hoy. 

She was married to the singer Erik Rubin, with whom she had two daughters.

Filmography

Films

Television

External links

Official Site

References 

Living people
1972 births
Mexican telenovela actresses
Mexican film actresses
Actresses from Mexico City
Mexican people of Basque descent